Gov. William T. Watson Mansion is a historic mansion located at Milford, Kent County, Delaware.  It was built in 1906, and is a two-story, five bay, center hall brick dwelling in the Classical Revival style. It features a full width front porch with massive round wooden Doric order columns and a hipped roof with dormers.  It was the home of Delaware Governor William T. Watson (1849-1917).

It was listed on the National Register of Historic Places in 1982.

References 

Houses on the National Register of Historic Places in Delaware
Neoclassical architecture in Delaware
Houses completed in 1906
Houses in Kent County, Delaware
Milford, Delaware
National Register of Historic Places in Kent County, Delaware
1906 establishments in Delaware